Żywiec Lake (Polish: Jezioro Żywieckie) is a reservoir on the Soła river in southern Poland, near the town of Żywiec. It was created in 1966, when several villages in the area, such as Zarzecze, Tresna, Zadziel and Old Żywiec were flooded following the construction of a dam. The lake has the area of around 10 square kilometres, and the earth-filled dam is 39 metres high and 310 metres long.

On November 15, 1978, at 5 a.m., two Autosan PKS buses, in a 15-minute interval, skidded while driving along the lake, and fell into icy water. The buses were carrying coal miners to work at Brzeszcze coal mine. Thirty people died, and nine survived. This tragedy is commemorated by a plaque near the bridge.

Sources 
 gmina Łodygowice, located at the lake (official website)
 Tourist information of Beskidy

Lakes of Poland
Reservoirs in Poland
Żywiec County
Lakes of Silesian Voivodeship